Pleurocope is a genus of crustaceans belonging to the monotypic family Pleurocopidae.

The species of this genus are found in Central America.

Species:

Pleurocope dasyura 
Pleurocope floridensis 
Pleurocope iriomotensis 
Pleurocope wilsoni

References

Crustaceans